Terán may refer to:

Geography
General Terán, Nuevo León Mexico
Terán, Cabuérniga, Spain
Fort Terán

People
Ana Enriqueta Terán (1918–2017), Venezuelan poet
Arleth Terán (born 1976), Mexican actress 
General Mier y Terán (1789–1832), the town's namesake
Héctor Terán Terán (1931–1998), Mexican politician
Mario Terán (1942–2022), Bolivian Army sergeant who executed Che Guevara
Teodelinda Terán Hicks (1889–1959), Ecuadorian cellist
Los Alegres de Terán, Norteño music group from Nuevo León, Mexico

See also
Teran (disambiguation)
Tehran, capital of Iran